Lee Tae-ho (born 16 March 1991 as Lee Joo-young) is a South Korean footballer who plays as a centre-back for Seoul E-Land on loan from Gangwon FC. He legally changed his name from Lee Joo-young to Lee Tae-ho in 2018.

Career
He joined Montedio Yamagata in 2013.

References

External links

Lee Tae-ho at Asian Games Incheon 2014

1991 births
Living people
Association football central defenders
South Korean footballers
South Korean expatriate sportspeople in Japan
South Korean expatriate footballers
J2 League players
Montedio Yamagata players
Tochigi SC players
JEF United Chiba players
Kamatamare Sanuki players
Gangwon FC players
Seoul E-Land FC players
Korea National League players
K League 1 players
K League 2 players
Expatriate footballers in Japan
Sungkyunkwan University alumni
Footballers at the 2014 Asian Games
Asian Games medalists in football
Asian Games gold medalists for South Korea
Medalists at the 2014 Asian Games
South Korea under-20 international footballers
South Korea under-23 international footballers